St Conleth's Park is a GAA stadium in Newbridge, County Kildare, Ireland. It is the county ground of Kildare's Gaelic football and hurling teams. It also served as the town's greyhound racing track from 1948 until 1968.

Ground
The ground formerly had a capacity of 13,000, but following a health and safety audit in 2011, this was reduced to 8,000 and subsequently to 6,200.

Greyhound racing
Greyhound racing at St Conleth's Park started on 30 April 1948. After only one year the GAA governing body banned racing around all of their pitches which meant the greyhound racing was suspended. However it restarted on 21 June 1950 with racing taking place over race distances of 310, 350, 525 and 550 yards and 350 yards hurdles.
The racing lasted a further eighteen years up until 1968, when it was decided that the greyhound operation would be better suited outside of the town at venue where racing could take place on a purpose built stadium. That stadium was Newbridge Greyhound Stadium which opened in 1972.

Track records

See also
 List of Gaelic Athletic Association stadiums
 List of stadiums in Ireland by capacity

References

Gaelic games grounds in the Republic of Ireland
Kildare GAA
Newbridge, County Kildare
Sports venues in County Kildare
Greyhound racing venues in the Republic of Ireland